The Gospel of the Seventy is a lost text from the New Testament apocrypha. The title of the text refers to the number of disciples sent by Jesus to preach in Luke's Gospel (quoted in some manuscripts as 72).

The Manicheans appear to have referred to the Gospel of Mani by this title, and as such it may be the same text.

See also
 List of Gospels
 Non-canonical books referenced in the Bible
 Seventy Disciples

Seventy